Elk Ranch Reservoir is located in Grand Teton National Park, in the U. S. state of Wyoming. Elk Ranch Reservoir is in the eastern section of the park and is impounded by the Uhl Dam, which is an  earth-filled dam constructed in the 1940s on land later acquired and incorporated into Grand Teton National Park.

References

Lakes of Grand Teton National Park